Hal Olsen is an American artist living in Albuquerque, New Mexico. He was a U.S. Navy aviation mechanic working on autopilots who also worked at Los Alamos National Lab as an artist for official bomb designs. His work was featured in the first issue of National Geographic Magazine. He is also the last living American nose artist who painted during World War II.

References
 http://www.nps.gov/archive/wapa/indepth/PacTheatTopics/HalOlsen.htm
 http://www.usaaf-noseart.co.uk/olsen-hal.htm

Year of birth missing (living people)
Living people
Artists from Albuquerque, New Mexico
United States Navy sailors
United States Navy personnel of World War II
20th-century American painters
American male painters
21st-century American painters
21st-century American male artists
20th-century American male artists